Joseph "Sepp" Gantenhammer is a retired American soccer goalkeeper who played professionally in the Major Indoor Soccer League and the American Indoor Soccer Association.

While still regularly known as "Joe" at the time, Gantenhammer played collegiately at Long Island University. He was taken early in the second round of the North American Soccer League draft with the 33rd overall pick by the Washington Diplomats. He played part of one indoor match for the Dips on February 12, 1978, making 13 saves in a 12–4 loss to Dallas. Gantenhammer did not make the Washington roster for the outdoor season, and instead settled in with the Pittsburgh Spirit of the Major Indoor Soccer League.  In 1979, he moved to the Houston Summit.  He was named the 1980 MISL Goalkeeper of the Year.  In 1980, he moved to the Baltimore Blast for two seasons before spending the 1983-1984 season with the Memphis Americans.  He played the 1984-1985 season with the Columbus Capitals in the American Indoor Soccer Association.  After retiring from playing professionally, Gantenhammer played for the Pan American Airlines Soccer Club.  He currently plays for the Las Vegas United Stars.

Yearly Awards
 MISL Goalkeeper of the Year: 1979–1980

References

External links
 MISL stats

1956 births
Living people
Sportspeople from Queens, New York
Soccer players from New York City
American soccer players
American Indoor Soccer Association players
American Soccer League (1933–1983) players
Association football goalkeepers
Baltimore Blast (1980–1992) players
Columbus Capitals players
Houston Summit players
LIU Sharks men's soccer players
Major Indoor Soccer League (1978–1992) players
Memphis Americans players
New Jersey Americans (ASL) players
North American Soccer League (1968–1984) indoor players
Pittsburgh Spirit players
Washington Diplomats (NASL) players